Ecology Center may refer to:

Ecology Center (Ann Arbor), of Ann Arbor, Michigan
Ecology Center (Berkeley), of Berkeley, California
Harold H. Malkmes Wildlife Education and Ecology Center, a park, zoo, and ecology site in Holtsville, New York
The Ecology Center (Orange County), of Orange County, California
Urban Ecology Center, a nonprofit organization in Milwaukee, Wisconsin